Deniz Baysal Yurtcu (born 5 April 1991) is a Turkish actress and model. She is best known for crime series "Teşkilat", "Söz" and romantic comedy "Kaçak Gelinler", drama "Fazilet Hanım ve Kızları", "Derin Sular".

Life and career
Baysal was born in İzmir. In 1991, she started to study foreign trade at Manisa Celal Bayar University. From the age of 10, she began to study acting at İzmir Karsiyaka Municipal Theater. She also worked as a theater actress for 10 years and started acting with the encouragement and support of the theater teacher.

In November 2018, Baysal got engaged to Barış Yurtçu, the lead singer of band Kolpa. They married on 6 September 2019.

Filmography

Television

Film

References

1991 births
Turkish film actresses
Turkish television actresses
Living people